Pacūnai (Pociūnai, formerly) is a village in Kėdainiai district municipality, in Kaunas County, in central Lithuania. According to the 2011 census, the village was uninhabited. There is a memorial cross for the exiled ones.

In the beginning of the 20th century there were two Pacūnai okolicas in Babtai volost. They was a property of the Jogintavičiai, Kalvaičiai, Marcinkevičiai, Jurevičiai families.

Demography

References

Villages in Kaunas County
Kėdainiai District Municipality